Karthavarayuni Katha is a 1958 Indian Telugu-language Hindu mythological film, produced and directed by T. R. Ramanna under the R. R. Pictures banner. It stars N. T. Rama Rao and Savitri , with music composed by G. Ramanadhan and Ashwathama. The film was simultaneously made as the Tamil movie  Kathavarayan (1958) by the same banner and director.

Plot
Once Goddess Parvathi (Kannamba) suspects Lord Shiva, for which she wants to make atonement by making penance. So, she reaches to Varanasi, Lord Shiva creates a beautiful garden for her and a foster son by the name Karthavaraya (N. T. Rama Rao) to protect. Once Karthavaraya tries to molest one of the ladies (Savitri) who visit there and the lady dies committing suicide. Lord Shiva curses Karthavaraya, when Parvathi tries to pacify him, she too receives a curse to take birth on earth. Parvathi comes to earth as Kamakshi along with Karthavaraya as a small baby. The girl whom Karthavaraya tried to molest also takes birth to an Arya king by the name Aryamala. Karthavaraya grows up among tribals. Once he goes to see his mother; with her blessing he gets the capacity to change to intended forms and starts to tour the country. In the tour, he gets acquainted with Aryamala and they fall in love. Parvathi says to him that it is not safe to love Aryamala, but Karthavaraya does not listen. From that time, he goes to the palace in different attires and marries Aryamala in a disguised form of a Brahmin. The Arya King does not accept their relation, Karthavaraya is captured by soldiers and in that quarrel, Aryamala is hit very badly. Karthavaraya was taken to the punishment area when he is to be impaled. Parvathi reaches there and begs the king not to do such a deed. But the King is not ready to listen, so, she prays to Lord Siva, who creates an apocalypse, by which the entire fort collapses. Finally, Karthavaraya and Aryamala are reunited, Parvathi is relieved from her curse and reaches Kailasam.

Cast
N. T. Rama Rao as Karthavaraya
Savitri as Aryamala
Rajanala as Tribal King
Ramana Reddy as Chinnappa
Mukkamala as King of Arya
Padmanabham as Chief Commander
K. V. S. Sarma
Balakrishna  
Kannamba as Goddess Parvati / Kamakshi 
Girija 
Surabi Balasaraswathi as Aaravalli
E. V. Saroja as Mohini

Soundtrack

Music composed by G. Ramanadhan & Ashwathama. Music released by Audio Company.

References

Telugu remakes of Tamil films
Hindu mythological films
Films directed by T. R. Ramanna
Films scored by G. Ramanathan